A traffic signal operations specialist (TSOS) is a certification sponsored by the Transportation Professional Certification Board, Inc., and promulgated by the Institute of Transportation Engineers.  Before taking the prerequisite examination, an individual must have at least five years of related working experience, though relevant education or training may be applied toward this requirement.  TSOS certification does not substitute for appropriate professional licenses when required for specific responsibilities or jurisdictions.

The 100-question certification examination currently includes the following topics:

Principles of signals and signal systems
Signal control and functionality
Types of signals 
Supporting hardware devices and subsystems
Signal coordination and progression 
System types 
Special user needs 
Design standards 
Traffic flow theory
Elements of signal design and implementation
Signal phasing and geometrics
Preemption and priority
Pavement markings and signing
Detectors 
Signal head, cabinet and pole placement
Temporary traffic control and equipment switch-over
Initial turn-on and timing adjustments
Signal Timing
Clearance intervals
Isolated signal timing
Coordinated signal timing
Data collection procedures
Performance measures
Software and analysis
Field implementation
Systems control 
Documentation
Signal operations and safety reviews
Safety audit
Scheduled field reviews 
Receipt of and response to public inquiries
Responsive field Reviews 
Reevaluation of phasing and timing
Signal removal or modification
Asset management and documentation

See also 

Traffic engineering
Traffic signal
Professional traffic operations engineer
Traffic operations practitioner specialist
Professional transportation planner

References 

Professional titles and certifications
Traffic signals